Lytechinus is a genus of sea urchins.

Species
The following extant species are listed in this genus by the World Register of Marine Species:

 Lytechinus callipeplus H.L. Clark, 1912
 Lytechinus euerces H.L. Clark, 1912
 Lytechinus panamensis Mortensen, 1921
 Lytechinus pictus (Verrill, 1867)
 Lytechinus semituberculatus (Valenciennes in L. Agassiz, 1846)
 Lytechinus variegatus (Lamarck, 1816)
 Lytechinus williamsi Chesher, 1968

References

External links
 

 
Echinoidea genera
Taxa named by Alexander Agassiz